Lola Doillon (born 9 January 1975) is a French director and screenwriter.

Personal life
Doillon is the daughter of director Jacques Doillon and film editor Noëlle Boisson. 

She is married to director Cédric Klapisch. They have a son, Émile, born in 2007.

Filmography

References

External links
 

1975 births
Living people
French film directors
French women film directors
French women screenwriters
French screenwriters
People from Charenton-le-Pont